Riverdale is a neighbourhood within the city of Whitehorse, Yukon, Canada. The community is separated from Whitehorse City Centre by the Yukon River, and is linked to Whitehorse via Lewes Boulevard, a major thoroughfare in the community.

The neighbourhood is home to the western end of the Grey Mountain and Viewpoint. Riverdale also has numerous low-rise apartments along Lewes Boulevard, which is relatively rare in Northern Canada.

The neighbourhood is served by the electoral districts of Riverdale North and Riverdale South in the Yukon Legislative Assembly.

Riverdale is relatively unique in Whitehorse because it is encircled by large mountains on three sides, with the Yukon River forming the fourth side.

References

External links
Riverdale Satellite Imagery, centred at 1 Lewes Boulevard

Neighbourhoods in Whitehorse